Haft Cheshmeh is a village in Jaber-e Ansar Rural District, in the Central District of Abdanan County, Ilam Province, Iran. At the 2006 census, its population was 1,738, in 337 families. The village is populated by Lurs.

References 

Populated places in Abdanan County
Luri settlements in Ilam Province